The State Register of Heritage Places is maintained by the Heritage Council of Western Australia. , 42 places are heritage-listed on Rottnest Island, of which 22 are on the State Register of Heritage Places.

List
The Western Australian State Register of Heritage Places, lists the following 22 state registered places on Rottnest Island:

See also
 Colonial buildings of Rottnest Island

References

Rottnest